Ali Shahr (also Romanized as ʿAlī Shahr; also known as ʿAlīshahr) is a city in the Central District of Bushehr County, Bushehr province, Iran. At the 2006 census, its population was 6,251 in 1,548 households, at which time it was a village. The following census in 2011 counted 12,820 people in 3,511 households. The latest census in 2016 showed a population of 23,178 people in 6,929 households, by which time it had risen to the status of a city. Ali Shahr is a planned community, 24 km southeast of the city of Bushehr.

References 

Cities in Bushehr Province
Populated places in Bushehr County